Manoug is a common Armenian given name meaning child.

Manoug Exerjian (1898–1974), American Armenian architect
Manoug Manougian, Lebanese Armenian scientist, professor, and father of the Lebanese space program
Manoug Parikian (1920–1987), British Armenian concert violinist and violin professor

See also
Manuk (disambiguation)
Manouk (disambiguation)

Armenian masculine given names